The 1944 Princeton Tigers football team was an American football team that represented Princeton University as an independent during the 1944 college football season. In its second and final season under head coach Harry Mahnken, the team compiled a 1–2 record and was outscored by a total of 40 to 22. Princeton played its 1944 home games at Palmer Stadium in Princeton, New Jersey.

Schedule

References

Princeton
Princeton Tigers football seasons
Princeton Tigers football